Richard Zach is a Canadian logician, philosopher of mathematics, and historian of logic and analytic philosophy. He is currently Professor of Philosophy at the University of Calgary.

Research

Zach's research interests include the development of formal logic and historical figures (Hilbert, Gödel, and Carnap) associated with this development. In the philosophy of mathematics Zach has worked on Hilbert's program and the philosophical relevance of proof theory. In mathematical logic, he has made contributions to proof theory (epsilon calculus, proof complexity) and to modal and many-valued logic, especially Gödel logic.

Career

Zach received his undergraduate education at the Vienna University of Technology and his Ph.D. at the Group in Logic and the Methodology of Science at the University of California, Berkeley. His dissertation, Hilbert's Program: Historical, Philosophical, and Metamathematical Perspectives, was jointly supervised by Paolo Mancosu and Jack Silver.

He has taught at the University of Calgary since 2001, and holds the rank of Professor. He has held visiting appointments at the University of California, Irvine and McGill University. Zach is a founding editor of the Review of Symbolic Logic and the Journal for the Study of the History of Analytic Philosophy, and is also associate editor of Studia Logica, and a subject editor for the Stanford Encyclopedia of Philosophy (History of Modern Logic). He serves on the editorial boards of the Bernays edition and the Carnap edition. He was elected to the Council of the Association for Symbolic Logic in 2008 and he has served on the ASL Committee on Logic Education and the executive committee of the Kurt Gödel Society.

References

External links
 Official Website
 LogBlog: A Logic Blog
 Departmental information page
 Society for the Study of the History of Analytical Philosophy
 Open Logic Project

Year of birth missing (living people)
Living people
Canadian philosophers
Academic staff of the University of Calgary
Mathematical logicians
Philosophers of mathematics
Austrian logicians